Schoemansdal (officially KaMatsamo) is a town in the province of Mpumalanga (eastern Transvaal) in South Africa. It is located 23 kilometres south of Malalane.

During the period when the policies of separate development were implemented under the apartheid regime, Schoemansdal was the capital of the bantustan named KaNgwane.

In November 2005 the South African government announced that the town's name had been changed to KaMatsamo. The new name is in honor of prince Matsamo Shongwe.

References

Populated places in the Nkomazi Local Municipality